Sharleen Spiteri was an Australian HIV+ sex worker, who became the focus of significant media, public and New South Wales Government attention in Australia after appearing on the 60 Minutes television programme in 1989, where she revealed in an interview that she sometimes had sex with clients without revealing her illness or using condoms.

After the 60 Minutes programme went to air, Spiteri was forcibly detained by New South Wales Police and Health Department authorities, using an obscure section of the Public Health Act (Section 32a), originally intended for the control of tuberculosis. She was kept in detention in Prince Henry Hospital's AIDS ward, and then Rozelle Mental Hospital for several weeks.

Into the early 1990s Spiteri's case continued to spark national public debate. A new law was introduced in New South Wales, colloquially known as "Sharleen's Law" where informed consent prior to sexual intercourse was required.

Although there were many other sex workers in the community who were also HIV+, in similar situations and known to authorities, after her initial release Spiteri came under subsequent public health orders (as well as other agreements undisclosed by the NSW Health Department), spending much of the remaining 16 years of her life under supervision of health workers as a public patient of the NSW Health system. She died in 2005.

Journalism, Moral Panic and the Public Interest

In 2015, Tom Morton and Eurydice Aroney, both journalists and lecturers at the University of Technology Sydney, published Journalism, Moral Panic and the Public Interest - The Case of Sharleen Spiteri. The paper questioned the ethics of the reporting of Spiteri's case.

References

External links 
 ABC Radio National Hindsight program about Sharleen Spiteri

2005 deaths
Year of birth missing
Australian female prostitutes
AIDS-related deaths in Australia
People with HIV/AIDS